León María Ignacio Agapito Guerrero y Francisco, GCrM KGCR (March 24, 1915 – June 24, 1982), better known simply as Leon Ma. Guerrero III, was a Filipino diplomat and novelist, and was one of the foremost Filipino nationalists of his era. A partner in the law practice of senator Claro M. Recto, he became Undersecretary of Foreign Affairs during the Magsaysay administration. His then controversial advocacy of Asia for the Asians and espousal of a realistic re-examination of relations with the United States are now commonly accepted as being ahead of their time.

Early life
Leoni, as his family called him, was born on 24 March 1915 in Ermita, Manila to one of the nation's most prominent families.

  His parents were Dr. Alfredo León Guerrero and  Filomena Francisco, the first Filipino woman pharmacist. His sister, Carmen Guerrero Nakpil, would also be grow up to be a journalist and one of the most preeminent figures in Philippine letters.

His paternal grandfather was León María Guerrero y Leogardo, a distinguished botanist, Malolos Congress delegate and member of the first Philippine Assembly. His maternal grandfather was Gabriel Beato Francisco, a journalist who had been manager of El Comercio, the foremost mercantile newspaper during the Spanish regime.

In 1938, he married Anita Corominas of Cebu. She was the daughter of Don Jose Corominas and Doña Paz Escaño. Her maternal grandparents were Don Fernando Escaño and Doña Agustina Faelnar. Her niece was married to the son of José E. Romero, the first Philippine ambassador to the Court of St. James's.

Later life
On retirement he was the country's senior career diplomat, having served as ambassador in London, Madrid, New Delhi, Mexico City and Belgrade. On June 19, 1982, only a few days before he died, he received the, Gawad Mabini, the highest award in the Philippine Foreign Service.

He held the rank of Knight Grand Cross of the Knights of Rizal. Among his many works are internationally acclaimed translations of José Rizal's Noli Me Tángere and El filibusterismo. He also wrote the biography of Rizal: The First Filipino.

Works
 Twilight in Tokyo 1946
 Passion and Death of the USAFFE 1947
 Report from Europe 1951
 Alternatives for Asians 1957
 An Asian on Asia 1958
 The First Filipino 1962 (Awarded first prize in the Rizal Biography Contest under the auspices of the José Rizal National Centennial Commission.)
 El Si y El No. 1963. (Winner of the Premio Zobel)
 Las Dos Muertes de General Aguinaldo (1964)
 Two Friars in Exodus (A Contribution to Studies in Philippine Church History) 1969
 The Philippine Revolution by Apolinario Mabini 1969
 Today Began Yesterday 1975
 We Filipinos (Posthumous anthology of his writings) 1984

Translations
 Noli Me Tangere, by José Rizal 1961
 El Filibusterismo, by José Rizal 1962

Honors and awards

: Grand Cross (Dakilang Kamanong) of the Gawad Mabini, 1982
 : The Order of the Knights of Rizal, Knight Grand Cross of Rizal (KGCR).

Sources

Filipino diplomats
People from Ermita
1915 births
1982 deaths
Ambassadors of the Philippines to the United Kingdom
Magsaysay administration personnel
Leon Maria III
Spanish-language writers of the Philippines
20th-century Filipino lawyers
Writers from Manila
Ateneo de Manila University alumni
Philippine Law School alumni